The 2006 Arkansas gubernatorial election took place on Tuesday, November 7, 2006. Incumbent Republican Governor Mike Huckabee was barred from seeking candidacy due to term limits set by the State Constitution in 1998, stating that the Governor may only serve two terms in their lifetime. Democratic nominee Mike Beebe, the Attorney General of Arkansas, defeated Republican nominee Asa Hutchinson, a former U.S. Representative, by a wide margin. 

Hutchinson later went on to win the governorship eight years later after Beebe was term-limited. This is the 1st open seat election since 1978.

Candidates

Democratic Party
Mike Beebe, Arkansas Attorney General

Republican Party
Asa Hutchinson, former Administrator of the Drug Enforcement Administration, former U.S. Representative from Arkansas's 3rd congressional district

Winthrop Paul Rockefeller, Lieutenant Governor. Withdrew due to illness and died in July 2006.

Green Party
Jim Lendall, former State Representative

Independent
Rod Bryan,  bass player for Ho-Hum and owner of Anthro-Pop Records

General Election

Predictions

Polling

Results

See also
2006 United States gubernatorial elections

External links
Official campaign website (Archived)
 Mike Beebe
 Asa Hutchinson
 Bill Halter
 Rod Bryan

References

Gubernatorial
2006
2006 United States gubernatorial elections